The year 2009 is the 3rd year in the history of Palace Fighting Championship, a mixed martial arts promotion based in the United States. In 2009 PFC held 4 events beginning with, PFC 12: High Stakes.

Events list

PFC 12: High Stakes

PFC 12: High Stakes was an event held on January 22, 2009 at the Tachi Palace in Lemoore, California, United States.

Results

PFC: Best of Both Worlds

PFC: Best of Both Worlds was an event held on February 6, 2009 at the Tachi Palace in Lemoore, California, United States.

Results

PFC: Best of Both Worlds 2

PFC: Best of Both Worlds 2 was an event held on April 23, 2009 at the Tachi Palace in Lemoore, California, United States.

Results

PFC 13: Validation

PFC 13: Validation was an event held on May 8, 2009 at the Tachi Palace in Lemoore, California, United States.

Results

See also 
 Palace Fighting Championship

References

Palace Fighting Championship events
2009 in mixed martial arts